Qarnaveh-ye Sofla (also Romanized as Qarnāveh-ye Soflá; also known as Qarnāveh-ye Pā’īn) is a village in Golidagh Rural District, Golidagh District, Maraveh Tappeh County, Golestan Province, Iran. At the 2006 census, its population was 603, in 113 families.

References 

Populated places in Maraveh Tappeh County